Gateway Mall is an enclosed shopping mall located in Lincoln, Nebraska managed by WPG. It was built in 1960, and is the largest shopping center in Lincoln, with 107 stores. The mall's anchor stores are Dillard's, David's Bridal, Dick's Sporting Goods, Round 1 Entertainment, and JCPenney.

History
The mall opened as Gateway Shopping Center in 1960, developed by Bankers Life Insurance Company of Nebraska (now Ameritas Life Insurance Company) at 60th and O streets on land adjacent to its headquarters. It was an open-air mall anchored by Montgomery Ward and local department store Miller & Paine.

An expansion was completed in 1971. Brandeis added a department store, in the unusual location of directly next door to Miller & Paine (typically, mall department store anchors are located apart from each other in separate wings). This project included an enclosed mall corridor and new Sears.

A new wing leading to a JCPenney department store was added in 1995; Penney's had been located in a former grocery store in a strip mall behind the shopping center after moving from downtown Lincoln. The original, open-air mall was also enclosed at this time, with a food court built in the southern end of the Center Court.

A $45 million renovation in 2004-2005 added a new food court and carousel in the Center Court area. The old Montgomery Ward space (vacated in 2001) was refitted with a new Steve and Barry's (which has since closed due to that retailer's bankruptcy) and Qdoba Mexican Grill, among other retailers.

Bankers Life sold the mall in 1985 to Jacobs Visconsi Jacobs (later The Jacobs Group). Westfield Group bought the mall in 2001. In June, 2012, Starwood Capital Group acquired the mall from Westfield. The mall is managed by JLL Associates.

In June 2013, several new stores opened at the mall, including Forever 21, which replaced one level of the former Montgomery Ward/Steve & Barry's.

In June 2016, it was announced that Dick's Sporting Goods would build a 70,000-square-foot store at the mall, which opened September 22, 2017. It will be built on the site of Granite City Food & Brewery, which has built a restaurant just west of the previous location.

On April 18, 2018, it was announced that Younkers would be closing as parent company The Bon-Ton Stores was going out of business. The store closed on August 29, 2018.

On December 28, 2018, it was announced that Sears would also be closing as part of a plan to close 80 stores nationwide. The store has closed as of March 2019.

On November 19, 2019, it was announced that Forever 21 would be closing as well as part of a plan to close 178 stores nationwide. The store closed on November 23, 2019.

In May 2022, Starwood Capital sold the property to Washington Prime Group for $51.5 million.

Anchors

Current
 Dillard's (3 levels, 158,806 square feet)
 JCPenney (2 levels, 125,870 square feet)
 Dick's Sporting Goods (2 levels, 70,000 square feet)

Former
 Miller & Paine (purchased by Dillard's in 1988)
 Brandeis (purchased by Younkers in 1987)
 Montgomery Ward (closed 2001; replaced by Steve & Barry's)
 Steve & Barry's (2 levels; closed November 2008; replaced by Forever 21 )
 Younkers (2 levels; closed August 29, 2018)
 Sears (2 levels, 120,631 square feet; closed March 2019)
 Forever 21 (1 level, 24,000 square feet, closed November 23, 2019, to be replaced by Ross Dress for Less)

Footnotes

References
 "Center court centerpiece," Lincoln Journal Star, September 26, 2004.
 "Gateway's goal to keep shoppers headed east," Lincoln Journal Star, March 6, 2005.

External links
 Official site

Shopping malls established in 1960
Shopping malls in Nebraska
Buildings and structures in Lincoln, Nebraska
Tourist attractions in Lincoln, Nebraska
CBL Properties
History of Lincoln, Nebraska